Ferula gummosa is a perennial herb of Ferula in the family Apiaceae. It is native to Iran and Turkmenistan. Its gum resin is called galbanum.

References 

gummosa